HMS Acasta was one of eight  destroyers built for the Royal Navy (RN) in the 1920s. The ship spent most of the 1930s assigned to the Mediterranean Fleet. During the early months of the Spanish Civil War of 1936–1939, Acasta spent considerable time in Spanish waters enforcing the arms blockade imposed by Britain and France on both sides of the conflict.

At the beginning of the Second World War in September 1939, the ship was assigned convoy escort duties in the English Channel and the Western Approaches that lasted until April 1940 when the Germans invaded Norway. That month Acasta was transferred to the Home Fleet and supported Allied operations in Norway.

Design and description 
The A-class destroyers were based on Amazon, slightly enlarged and carrying two more torpedo tubes. Acasta was powered by a pair of Brown-Curtis geared steam turbines, each driving one shaft, using steam provided by three Admiralty 3-drum boilers. The complement of the A-class ships was 134 officers and ratings and increased to 143 by 1940.

Their main armament consisted of four QF 4.7-inch (120 mm) Mk IX guns in single mounts, in two superfiring pairs in front of the bridge and aft of the superstructure. For anti-aircraft (AA) defence, they had two  QF 2-pounder Mk II AA guns mounted on a platform between their funnels. The ships were fitted with two above-water quadruple mounts for  torpedoes. Carrying the minesweeping paravanes on the quarterdeck limited depth charge chutes to three with two depth charges provided for each chute. The A-class destroyers were given space for an ASDIC system, but it was not initially fitted.

Construction and career
Acasta was ordered on 6 March 1928 from John Brown & Company under the 1929 Naval Programme. She was laid down at their Clydebank, Scotland, shipyard on 13 August 1928, and launched on 8 August 1929, as the fourth ship of the name to serve in the RN. The ship was completed on 11 February 1930 at a cost of £227,621 excluding items supplied by the Admiralty such as guns, ammunition and communications equipment. Acasta was commissioned at Clydebank three days later and was assigned to the 3rd Destroyer Flotilla (DF) of the Mediterranean Fleet after working up.

The ship remained with the 3rd DF until 1937 aside from refits in HM Dockyard, Devonport (30 August–29 October 1932 and 29 April–3 July 1935). She also had a refit in Gibraltar between 24 November and 20 December 1933. The ship spent of her time between September 1936 and April 1937 aiding refugees and making non-intervention patrols in Spanish waters. She returned home at the end of that month and began a long refit at Devonport on 1 May that lasted until 11 April 1938 and included the installation of ASDIC. Acasta was then assigned to the 7th DF and served in Irish waters until beginning a refit at Devonport between 3 November and 17 January 1939. The ship was then assigned as the emergency destroyer for Plymouth and aided Vickers-Armstrongs in testing ASDIC equipment for the Argentinian light cruiser La Argentina over the period 2–13 March.

Wartime service
When the Second World War began in September 1939, Acasta was assigned to the 18th DF at Plymouth and escorted convoys in the English Channel until she was refitted again at Devonport between 20 December and 5 January 1940. The ship was then transferred to the Western Approaches and escorted a total of 22 convoys through April 1940. On 31 January 1940, she helped to escort the light cruiser  into Plymouth on her return from her battle with the heavy cruiser .

After the German invasion of Norway on 9 April, Acasta was transferred to the Home Fleet. On 13 April, the ship joined the escort of Convoy NP1, on passage to Norway with troops for the planned landings at Narvik, but the convoy was diverted to Harstad. During 9–15 May, she escorted the badly damaged light cruiser  to the Clyde for repairs after she struck a rock. Acasta remained with the carriers' escort throughout early June.

Ardent and Acasta escorted Glorious back to Scapa Flow on 8 June. En route, the three ships were spotted by Scharnhorst and Gneisenau at 15:46, which changed course to investigate. They were not spotted by the British until shortly after 16:00 and Ardent was ordered to identify the German ships while the other ships remained on course. She turned back to rejoin them before the Germans opened fire at 16:27 and was engaged by the  secondary armament, mostly by Scharnhorst, while both ships fired at Glorious with their main batteries. Acasta remained with the carrier and began making smoke after the Germans opened fire, even opening fire herself although her guns lacked the range to reach the battleships. The destroyer was struck not long after she began laying smoke, but it had little effect. After the carrier was hit multiple times and began to list, Acasta left her and closed with the battleships to shorten the range for a torpedo attack. Now more visible to the battleships, she began to be hit more regularly. The first attack was unsuccessful, but one of the four torpedoes from the second attack blew a  hole in Scharnhorsts hull at 17:34, flooding and disabling her starboard engine room. Acasta was then reduced to a blazing wreck and her captain, C.E. Glasfurd, ordered her crew to abandon ship. One of the gun crews delayed long enough to fire a shot that struck one of the Scharnhorsts main guns, but inflicted nothing more than shrapnel damage. The destroyer sank stern first around 18:20. Most of her crew died from exposure before the Norwegian merchant ship  rescued two survivors from Acasta three days later, along with 36 men from Glorious. One of the men from Acasta later died of his wounds. All of the men saved by Borgund were set ashore at Tórshavn in the Faroe Islands on 13 June. Eight officers and 153 ratings were lost with Acasta or died of their wounds afterwards.

Footnotes

References

External links
 HMS Acasta at World War II Database
 HMS Acasta - Site dedicated to remembering those who served aboard HMS Acasta H09.
 Scharnhorst - The History - an excellent summary of the battle leading to Acastas sinking.
 Scharnhorst - Operation "Juno" - technical specs and pictures of HMS Acasta.
 Glarac Association - remembering those lost with HMS Acasta, with complete CWGC casualty list.
 HMS Acasta (Clydebuilt Ships Database)

 

A- and B-class destroyers
1929 ships
World War II destroyers of the United Kingdom
World War II shipwrecks in the Norwegian Sea
Maritime incidents in June 1940
Ships built on the River Clyde